Marvin Darnell Harrison Jr. (born August 11, 2002) is an American football wide receiver for the Ohio State Buckeyes. After receiving limited playing time in 2021, Harrison would emerge as a star in 2022 being named a unanimous All-American and the Richter–Howard Receiver of the Year. He is the son of Pro Football Hall of Fame wide receiver Marvin Harrison.

Early life and high school career
Harrison was born on August 11, 2002, in Philadelphia, Pennsylvania, to Dawne and Marvin Harrison. His father played wide receiver for the Indianapolis Colts from 1996 to 2008 and was later inducted into the Pro Football Hall of Fame. Harrison attended La Salle College High School as a freshman before transferring to St. Joseph's Preparatory School. At St. Josephs Harrison would help lead the team to three consecutive state championships while setting Philadelphia Catholic League career records with 2,625 receiving yards and 37 receiving touchdowns. While at St. Joseph's, he played with Ohio State quarterback Kyle McCord. Coming out of high school Harrison was a four star prospect ranked the nations 14th best receiver recruit. He committed to play college football at Ohio State University over offers from Florida, Michigan, Penn State, LSU, Notre Dame, and Texas A&M. Harrison cited wide receiver coach Brian Hartline as well as schools atmosphere and facilities as being the reasons for his commitment to the school.

College career

2021 
Harrison enrolled at Ohio State in January 2021. As a freshman in 2021, he received limited playing time behind future first round draft picks Garrett Wilson, and Chris Olave. After having five receptions for 68 yards in the regular season, he would make his first career start in the 2022 Rose Bowl after Wilson and Olave declared for the 2022 NFL Draft. In the Rose Bowl, he caught six passes for 71 yards and three touchdowns in a 48-45 victory over the Utah Utes.

2022 
Harrison entered his sophomore season with high expectations following his breakout performance in the Rose Bowl. In the Buckeyes season opener against Notre Dame, Harrison would catch five passes for 76 yards. Following an injury to fellow receiver Jaxon Smith-Njigba against Notre Dame, Harrison would become the Buckeyes #1 receiver for the remainder of the season. In his first game as the teams #1 receiver Harrison would catch seven passes for a then career-high 184 yards and three touchdowns in a victory over Arkansas State. The following week he would have his second consecutive 100-yard game with 102 yards on 6 catches and two touchdowns in a blowout win over Toledo. Following a relatively unimpressive first two conference games, Harrison would return to form against Michigan State, catching 7 passes for 132 yards and three touchdowns. His three touchdowns against Michigan State marked his third career three-touchdown game, the most of any Ohio State receiver. On October 29, 2022, Harrison would set career highs in receptions (10) and yards (185) in a 44-31 victory over Penn State. Two weeks later he would once again have a 100-yard game, this time against Indiana. Against rival Michigan Harrison would record his 6th 100-yard performance of the season in a 45-23 loss, the Buckeyes first of the season. Despite the loss to Michigan, Ohio State would earn a bid to the College Football Playoff where they would play the defending national champion Georgia Bulldogs in the Peach Bowl. Leading up to the game, Harrison's matchup against corner Kellee Ringo was viewed by many as the potential key to the game. Harrison would shine in the first half of the contest, catching 5 passes for 105 yards and two touchdowns, helping Ohio State gain a 35-24 lead. In the third quarter he was forced to leave the game with a concussion following a hard hit from Javon Bullard. In Harrison's absence Georgia would mount a comeback to win the game 42-41, ending Ohio State's season. At the conclusion of the season, Harrison was voted a unanimous All-American and was named the Richter–Howard Receiver of the Year after recording 1,263 yards and 14 touchdowns.

References

External links
 
 Ohio State Buckeyes bio

2002 births
Living people
Players of American football from Philadelphia
American football wide receivers
Ohio State Buckeyes football players
African-American players of American football
St. Joseph's Preparatory School alumni
All-American college football players